Nelles is a surname. Notable people with the surname include:

H. Vivian Nelles, Canadian historian
Mathilde Nelles (born 1997), Belgian alpine ski racer
Maurice Nelles, American engineer, business executive and professor
Percy W. Nelles (1892–1951), Canadian admiral
Robert Nelles (1761–1842), Canadian businessman and political figure
Samuel Sobieski Nelles (1823–1887), Canadian Methodist minister and academic
Walter Nelles (1883–1937), American lawyer and law professor

See also
Fred C. Nelles Youth Correctional Facility, was in essence a prison for youth located on Whittier Boulevard, in Whittier, California (US)
Nellis

References